opened in Takikawa, Hokkaidō, Japan in 1986.

See also
 List of Natural Monuments of Japan (Hokkaidō)

References

External links
  Takikawa Museum of Art and Natural History

Takikawa, Hokkaido
Museums in Hokkaido
Museums established in 1986
1986 establishments in Japan
Natural history museums in Japan